The Little Street (Het Straatje) is a painting by the Dutch painter Johannes Vermeer, executed c. 1657-1658. It is exhibited at the Rijksmuseum of Amsterdam, and signed, below the window in the lower left-hand corner, "I V MEER".

Painting

The painting, showing a quiet street, depicts a typical aspect of the life in a Dutch Golden Age town. It is one of only three Vermeer paintings of views of Delft, the others being View of Delft and the now lost House Standing in Delft. This painting is considered to be an important work of the Dutch master.

Straight angles alternate with the triangle of the house and of the sky giving the composition a certain vitality. The walls, stones and  brickwork are painted in a thicker paint layer, such that it makes them almost palpable.

Painting materials
Vermeer achieved the realistic depiction of the surfaces with the masterful application of a relatively limited number of pigments. He employed red ochre and madder lake for the reddish-brown brick wall, the blue in the sky contains lead white and natural ultramarine. The green shutters and foliage are painted with azurite mixed with lead-tin-yellow.

Location

While generally agreed to depict a contemporary street scene in 17th-century Delft, where Vermeer lived and worked, the exact location of the scene Vermeer painted has long been a topic of research and discussion, with studies arguing for the Voldersgracht, where the Vermeer Centre is located, or the Nieuwe Langendijk at the present-day numbers 22 to 26.

In 2015, archival research based on the city's quay dues register, which gives detailed measurements of all houses and passageways along the canals of Delft at the time, has resulted in the conclusion that the site is the Vlamingstraat, a street with a narrow canal, at the present-day numbers 40 and 42.
The research also found that the property on the right in the painting belonged to Vermeer’s aunt, Ariaentgen Claes van der Minne. She had a business selling tripe, and the passageway beside the house was known as the Penspoort, or Tripe Gate. Vermeer’s mother and sister also lived on the same canal, diagonally opposite. Further research showed that the buildings and tree behind the house as seen on the painting match with period correct maps of the location. Also the location of the outlet sewer of the 'tripe' gutter running from the left doorway to the canal is correct in this present day

See also
 Dutch Golden Age painting
 List of paintings by Johannes Vermeer

References

Further reading

External links
 Location of Vermeer's The Little Street
 Johannes Vermeer, A Little Street, ColourLex

1657 paintings
1658 paintings
Landscape paintings by Johannes Vermeer
Paintings in the collection of the Rijksmuseum
Cityscape paintings